Muhammad Nashran bin Elias (born 2 March 2001) is a Malaysian professional footballer who plays as a defender.

References

External links
 

Living people
Malaysian footballers
Malaysia Super League players
UiTM FC players
Association football defenders
2001 births